Gerda Dendooven (born 10 May 1962) is a Belgian illustrator. She has won numerous awards for her work, including the Gouden Uil, the Woutertje Pieterse Prijs and the Boekenpauw on several occasions.

Early life 

Dendooven was born in 1962 in Marke, Belgium. She studied Vrije Grafiek at the Royal Academy of Fine Arts in Ghent.

Career

Children's literature 

In 1987, she illustrated her first children's book Geen gezoen, vlug opendoen by Ed Franck. Dendooven went on to illustrate many books by many different authors, including Herman Brusselmans, Toon Tellegen and Bart Moeyaert. Other authors include Elvis Peeters, Michael De Cock and Wally De Doncker.

In 1996, she was nominated for the Hans Christian Andersen Award. Dendooven also won several awards for books that she wrote and illustrated herself, such as IJsjes (for which she won a Boekenpauw in 1990), Soepkinders (for which she won a Boekenpluim in 2006) and Hoe het varken aan zijn krulstaart kwam (for which she won both a Zilveren Griffel and Boekenpluim in 2010).

She won the Vlag en Wimpel award in 1998 for illustrating the book Nietes welles and in 2015 for writing the book De wondertuin.

In 2017, she won the Woutertje Pieterse Prijs for her book Stella, ster van de zee. She was also nominated for this award in 2015 and 2016.

Theatre 

Dendooven has also written various texts for stage plays. In 2001, she participated in the play Bremen is niet ver in collaboration with Geert Hautekiet, Bart Moeyaert and Ianka Fleerackers.

Personal life 

Dendooven is in a relationship with typographist and designer Gert Dooreman and they have two daughters.

Awards 

 1990: Prijs van de Kinder- en Jeugdjury voor het boek in Vlaanderen, Met de kont tegen de krib
 1990: Boekenpauw, IJsjes
 1992: Prijs van de Kinder- en Jeugdjury voor het boek in Vlaanderen, De meester is een schat
 1995: Boekenpauw, Strikjes in de Struiken
 1995: Prijs van de Kinder- en Jeugdjury voor het boek in Vlaanderen, Prins Pukkel
 1998: Vlag en Wimpel, Nietes welles
 2000: Zilveren Penseel, De verliefde prins
 2000: Boekenpluim, De verliefde prins
 2001: Gouden Uil, Luna van de boom (with Bart Moeyaert and Filip Bral)
 2002: Boekenpauw, Meneer Papier gaat uit wandelen
 2004: Vlag en Wimpel, Meneer Papier is verscheurd
 2004: Prijs van de Vlaamse Gemeenschap voor Jeugdliteratuur, Mijn mama
 2006: Boekenpluim, Soepkinders
 2007: Boekenpauw, Het verhaal van Slimme Krol. En hoe hij aan de dood ontsnapte
 2010: Zilveren Griffel, Hoe het varken aan zijn krulstaart kwam
 2010: Boekenpluim, Hoe het varken aan zijn krulstaart kwam
 2013: Zilveren Palet, Takkenkind
 2013: Boekenwelp, Takkenkind
 2015: Vlag en Wimpel, De wondertuin
 2017: Woutertje Pieterse Prijs, Stella, ster van de zee

References

External links 

 Gerda Dendooven (in Dutch), Digital Library for Dutch Literature
 Gerda Dendooven (in Dutch), jeugdliteratuur.org

Living people
1962 births
Woutertje Pieterse Prize winners
Belgian illustrators
Belgian women illustrators
Boekenpauw winners
Belgian children's book illustrators
20th-century Belgian women
21st-century Belgian women